The Luxembourg Commission was a 19th-century labour commission introduced by the Provisional Government of France. It was formed on 25 February 1848, following the abdication of Louis-Philippe. The establishment of the Luxembourg Commission, an assembly of workers' delegates headed by Louis Blanc, was charged with the task of surveying social problems and suggesting solutions. The elegant gesture from the Provisional Government was discontinued later that year.

References

Trade unions in France